Saint-Sulpice-le-Dunois (Limousin: Sent Sepise) is a commune in the Creuse department located in central France.

Population

See also
Communes of the Creuse department

References

Communes of Creuse